Kürdlər or Kyurtlar or Kurdlyar may refer to:
Kürdlər, Aghjabadi, Azerbaijan
Kürdlər, Agdam, Azerbaijan
Kürdlər, Fizuli, Azerbaijan
Kürdlər, Jalilabad, Azerbaijan
Kürdlər, Jabrayil, Azerbaijan
Qurdlar (disambiguation), Azerbaijan